The Tipton County Courthouse is a historic courthouse located at Tipton, Tipton County, Indiana. The courthouse is Tipton's third and was completed in 1894. The courthouse is an example of Romanesque Revival style architecture and was designed by Adolph Scherrer who also designed the 1888 Indiana State Capitol and Tipton County Jail and Sheriff's Home. Sherrer took over the architectural design work for the Indiana Statehouse project from Edwin May who died in 1880. Five years after the completion of the capitol building project in 1888, Scherrer began work on the Tipton County Courthouse building.

It is built of sandstone in a Romanesque Revival style with a clock tower that rises 206 feet above the ground. It is topped by a flagstaff. The building was constructed by Pierce and Morgan of Indianapolis during 1893 and 1894 at a cost of $170,988. It is one of several Romanesque courthouses dating from the 1890s that are still in use.

It was added to the National Register of Historic Places on March 1, 1984.

See also
National Register of Historic Places listings in Indiana

Notes

References

County courthouses in Indiana
Courthouses on the National Register of Historic Places in Indiana
Romanesque Revival architecture in Indiana
Government buildings completed in 1894
Buildings and structures in Tipton County, Indiana
1894 establishments in Indiana
National Register of Historic Places in Tipton County, Indiana